Red Back Fever/Left Hand Drive is a double album by Australian hard rock band The Angels, released in July 1992. The album is a re-issue of 1991's Red Back Fever with a disc, titled Left Hand Drivewhich is a disc of remixes, rarities, unreleased and deleted songs and B-Sides. This was later released as the second disc of Greatest Hits - the Mushroom Years with the addition of the track "Blue Light" from the deleted Hard Evidence Tour E.P..

The set peaked at number 28 on the ARIA Charts.

Track listing 
Disc 1 – Red Back Fever
 "Tear Me Apart" (Bob Spencer, Richard Brewster, Brent Eccles) – 5:15
 "Some of That Love" (Spencer, R. Brewster, Eccles) – 3:51 
 "Once Bitten Twice Shy" (Ian Hunter) – 4:38 (Ian Hunter cover)
 "Child in You" (Amanda Brewster, R. Brewster) – 3:28
 "Lyin' Awake in Bed" (Spencer, R. Brewster, Eccles) – 5:42 
 "Bedroom After Bedroom" (A. Brewster, Eccles, R. Brewster) – 3:58 
 "Red Back Fever" (Spencer, Eccles, Doc Neeson, James Morley, R. Brewster) – 3:59	
 "Don't Need You" (Spencer, Eccles, Morley, R.Brewster) – 2:20
 "Natural Born Woman" (Steve Marriott) – 3:40 (Humble Pie cover)
 "High and Dry" (Spencer, Eccles)  – 5:53 
 "Hold On" (Spencer, R. Brewster, Eccles) – 6:12
 "No More Words" (Spencer, R. Brewster, Eccles) – 1:42

Disc 2 – Left Hand Drive
 "Don't Waste My Time" (Spencer, R. Brewster) – 5:15
 "Junk City" (Neeson, R. Brewster, Spencer) – 6:23
 "Dead Man's Shoes" (R. Brewster) – 4:37
 "Backstreet Pickup" (Lipstick Remix) (Spencer, Neeson, R. Brewster, Morley, Terry Manning) – 7:25
 "Don't Break Me Down" (Spencer, Eccles, R. Brewster) – 4:48
 "Tear Me Apart" (Spencer, Eccles, R. Brewster) – 3:33
 "Straight Aces" (Neeson, Jim Hilbun, Eccles, R. Brewster) – 4:02
 "Blood on the Moon" (A. Brewster, R. Brewster) – 3:02
 "Take an X (Neeson, R. Brewster, Spencer) – 6:37
 "Man There" (R. Brewster) – 5:05

Personnel 
The Angels
 Doc Neeson – lead vocals 
 Rick Brewster – lead guitar, keyboards, backing vocals
 Bob Spencer – guitar, backing vocals
James Morley – bass guitar, backing vocals
 Brent Eccles – drums

Production
 Steve James – producer, engineer, mixing
 The Angels – producer
 David Hemming – mixing engineer
 Don Bartley – mastering engineer
 Craig McGill – design,  illustration,  artwork

Charts

References 

1992 albums
The Angels (Australian band) albums
Mushroom Records albums